The  or FGF (lit. 'General Federation of Civil Servants') is a trade union federation for civil servants in France.

The federation was established by Workers' Force (FO) in 1953.  It currently brings together six federations affiliated to FO:

 Federation of Equipment, Environment, Transport and Services
 Federation of General State Administration
 Federation of Trade Unions of the Ministry of the Interior
 FO Defence
 FO Finance Federation
 National Federation of Education, Culture and Vocational Training

General Secretaries
1953: Pierre Tribié
1973: André Giauque
1987: Roland Gaillard
2003: Gérard Noguès
2009: Anne Baltazar
2012: Christian Grolier

External links

References

Civil service trade unions
Trade unions in France
Trade unions established in 1953